James Weir (born 12 April 1939 in Glasgow, Scotland) is a Scottish former footballer.

Career
Weir joined Fulham from Clydebank Juniors in July 1957. After making three league appearances for Fulham, he joined York City in June 1960. He was York's top scorer in the 1961–62 season, after scoring 29 goals. After making 95 appearances and scoring 39 goals for York, he joined Mansfield Town in September 1962. He made 18 league appearances and scored three goals for Mansfield before joining Luton Town in August 1963. He joined Tranmere Rovers in July 1964, after making 12 appearances and scoring one goals for Luton. He made 13 appearances and scored three goals for Tranmere.

References

1939 births
Living people
Footballers from Glasgow
Scottish footballers
Association football wingers
Fulham F.C. players
York City F.C. players
Mansfield Town F.C. players
Luton Town F.C. players
Tranmere Rovers F.C. players
English Football League players
Clydebank Juniors F.C. players
Scottish Junior Football Association players